Vyacheslav Khamulkin (born 1 February 1972) is a Belarusian diver. He competed at the 1996 Summer Olympics and the 2000 Summer Olympics.

References

1972 births
Living people
Belarusian male divers
Olympic divers of Belarus
Divers at the 1996 Summer Olympics
Divers at the 2000 Summer Olympics
Sportspeople from Minsk